South Pond is a lake northeast of Big Moose, New York. The outlet creek flows into Twitchell Creek. Fish species present in the lake are brown trout, brook trout, and lake trout. There is trail access on the south shore. No motors are allowed on this lake.

References

Lakes of New York (state)
Lakes of Herkimer County, New York